Woodstown is an extinct town in Henry County, in the U.S. state of Georgia.

History
A post office called Woodstown was established in 1893, and remained in operation until 1901. William Woods, an early postmaster, gave the town his last name.

References

Geography of Henry County, Georgia
Ghost towns in Georgia (U.S. state)